Lodi is an unincorporated community in Tinicum Township in Bucks County, Pennsylvania, United States. Lodi is located along Lodi Hill Road just southwest of an intersection with Pennsylvania Route 32 along the Delaware River in the northern corner of Tinicum Township near the Bridgeton Township border.

References

Unincorporated communities in Bucks County, Pennsylvania
Unincorporated communities in Pennsylvania